The 2020–21 season is the 137th season of Tranmere Rovers in existence and their first back in EFL League Two having been relegated after the premature conclusion of the 2019–20 EFL League One season due to the impact of the COVID-19 pandemic on association football. Along with competing in League Two, the club will also participate in the FA Cup, EFL Cup and EFL Trophy. 
The season covers the period from 1 July 2020 to 30 June 2021.

Transfers

Transfers in

Loans in

Loans out

Transfers out

Pre-season

Competitions

League Two

League table

Result summary

Results by matchday

Matches

The 2020–21 season fixtures were released on 21 August.

Play-offs

FA Cup

The draw for the first round was made on Monday 26, October. The second round draw was revealed on Monday, 9 November by Danny Cowley. The third round draw was made on 30 November, with Premier League and EFL Championship clubs all entering the competition.

EFL Cup

The first round draw was made on 18 August, live on Sky Sports, by Paul Merson.

EFL Trophy

The regional group stage draw was confirmed on 18 August. The second round draw was made by Matt Murray on 20 November, at St Andrew’s. The third round was made on 10 December 2020 by Jon Parkin. The draw for the semi-final was announced on 5 February.

Squad statistics
Source:

Numbers in parentheses denote appearances as substitute.
Players with squad numbers struck through and marked  left the club during the playing season.
Players with names in italics and marked * were on loan from another club for the whole of their season with Newport County.
Players listed with no appearances have been in the matchday squad but only as unused substitutes.
Key to positions: GK – Goalkeeper; DF – Defender; MF – Midfielder; FW – Forward

References

Tranmere Rovers F.C. seasons
Tranmere Rovers